The National Democratic Union of Casual Workers (Zenminro) was a trade union representing workers in the Japanese construction industry who were not on contracts.

The union was founded in 1955 and later affiliated to the Japanese Confederation of Labour.  It had 15,973 members in 1967, but by 1985 its membership had fallen to only 5,428.

References

Building and construction trade unions
Trade unions established in 1955
Trade unions in Japan